Buława , German Buhlau, is a village in the administrative district of Gmina Strzeleczki (Gemeinde Klein Strehlitz), within Krapkowice County, Opole Voivodeship, in the south-western region of Upper Silesia in Poland.

Since 2006 the village, along with the entire commune, has been bilingual in German and Polish.

The village has a population of 120 people. It is administered as part of the village of Pisarzowice (Schreibersdorf).

References

Villages in Krapkowice County